Calicotome is a genus of flowering plants in the family Fabaceae. It belongs to the subfamily Faboideae. It may be synonymous with Cytisus. All species of the genus are thorny shrubs. The ancient Greeks believed that tyrants in Hades were punished by being beaten with the thorny calycotomes.

Species 
Calicotome comprises the following species:

References

External links 

 
Fabaceae genera